Act of Murder may refer to:

 An Act of Murder, a 1948 American film noir directed by Michael Gordon
 Act of Murder (film), a 1964 British crime drama film directed by Alan Bridges
 Act of Murder, a 1993 documentary film by Shirley Horrocks
 Act of Murder (novel), a 2010 novel by Alan Wright
 An Act of Murder, a work of interactive fiction by Christopher Huang, nominated for multiple 2007 XYZZY Awards

See also
 Homicide
 Murder
 UK Acts of Parliament
 Murder Act 1751
 Homicide Act 1957
 Murder (Abolition of Death Penalty) Act 1965